Ahmadabad-e Do (also Romanized as Aḩmadābād-e Do; also known as Aḩmadābād) is a village in Baghin Rural District, in the Central District of Kerman County, Kerman Province, Iran. At the 2006 census, its population was 111, in 26 families.

References 

Populated places in Kerman County